Hanfried Lenz (22 April 1916 in Munich1 June 2013 in Berlin) was a German mathematician, who is mainly known for his work in geometry and combinatorics.

Hanfried Lenz was the eldest son of Fritz Lenz an influential German geneticist, who is associated with Eugenics and hence also with the Nazi racial policies during the Third Reich. He was also the older brother of Widukind Lenz, a geneticist. He started to study mathematics and physics at the University of Tübingen, but interrupted his studies from 1935 to 1937 to do his military service. After that he continued to study in Munich, Berlin and Leipzig. In 1939 when World War II broke out in Europe, he became a soldier in the western front and during a vacation he passed the exams for his teacher certification. He married Helene Ranke in 1943 and 1943–45 he worked on radar technology in a laboratory near Berlin.

After World War II Hanfried Lenz was classified as a "follower" by the denazification process. He started to work as a math and physics teacher in Munich and in 1949 he became an assistant at the Technical University of Munich. He received his PhD in 1951 and his Habilitation in 1953. He worked as a lecturer until he became an associate professor in 1959. In 1969 he finally became a full professor at the Free University of Berlin and worked there until his retirement in 1984.

He was also politically active and in connection with his opposition to the rebuilding of the German army in the early 50s, he became a member of the Social Democratic Party (SPD) in 1954. Later, partially due to being alienated by the student movement of the '60s, his leanings became more conservative again and in 1972 he left the SPD to join the Christian Democratic Union.

Hanfried Lenz is known for his work on the classification of projective planes and in 1954 he showed how one can introduce affine spaces axiomatically without constructing them from projective spaces or vector spaces. This result is now known as the theorem of Lenz. During his later years he also worked in the area of combinatorics and published a book on design theory (together with Dieter Jungnickel and Thomas Beth).

In 1995 the Institute of Combinatorics and its Applications awarded the Euler Medal to Hanfried Lenz.

Notes

References

Christoph Kaiser:  Lernen heißt irren dürfem. Berliner Zeitung, 2002-4-15
 Prof. Dr. Hanfried Lenz ist am 1. Juni 2013 gestorben - news at the math department of the Free University of Berlin (German)
 Walter Benz: "Zum mathematischen Werk von Hanfried Lenz", Journal of Geometry 43, 1992 (German)
 Hanfried Lenz: Mehr Glück als Verstand,  Books on Demand 2002, Autobiography (German)
"Ich habe halt Schwein gehabt". FU-Nachrichten, number 5,2005 (German)

External links
 Wikipedia userpage of Hanfried Lenz in the German Wikipedia

1916 births
2013 deaths
Scientists from Munich
People from the Kingdom of Bavaria
20th-century German mathematicians
All-German People's Party politicians
Social Democratic Party of Germany politicians
Christian Democratic Union of Germany politicians
Academic staff of the Technical University of Munich
German Army personnel of World War II